NLJ may mean:

 Nathan Leigh Jones, a recording artist
 The National Liberty Journal, a newspaper published by Jerry Falwell
 The National Law Journal
 National Library of Jamaica